Steel Creek or Steels Creek may refer to:
Steel Creek Township, Holt County, Nebraska
Steel Creek (Niobrara River tributary), a stream in Holt and Knox Counties, Nebraska
Steels Creek, Victoria

See also
 Steele Creek (disambiguation)